Manuel Guajardo Mejorado (January 4, 1933 – May 11, 1992), better known as René Guajardo, was a Mexican professional wrestler.

Professional wrestling career
René Guajardo was born in Villa Mainero, Tamaulipas, Mexico. At the age of 16, Guajardo decided to become a professional luchador. He joined a wrestling gym in Monterrey, Nuevo León, where he was trained by Gerardo Rodríguez Pérez (Zandor wrestler), Chema López and Rolando Vera. René made his debut in 1954 against Oso Negro. His hard work and determination caught the eye of EMLL recruiters who offered him a contract with their promotion company. He debuted for Empresa Mexicana de Lucha Libre (EMLL) in Arena Coliseo on October 8 of that same year.

During his first three years in the business, he wrestled as a técnico, but in 1957 he watched the then rudo Karloff Lagarde wrestle in Monterrey and started to wonder if he'd have more success as a rudo. René and Karloff would eventually become good friends. Lagarde was already an established main event star and held the National Welterweight Title, however, most main event matches were between Tag teams, and he knew that he would have more success as a member of a tag team. Lagarde believed the young luchador had a lot of raw talent so he proposed that the two form a team, an offer which Guajardo accepted. After teaming with Lagarde, he began competing in main event matches in a matter of weeks. Guajardo thrived in the spotlight, his technical skills combined with his violent and energetic style made him one of the most hated rudos in Mexico. He was referred to as "un rudo con recursos" (a rudo with technical resources). On October 13, 1960, Guajardo defeated his mentor Rolando Vera in a match for the NWA World Middleweight Championship. For the next 13 years, Guajardo would exchange that title with Antonio Posa, Rayo de Jalisco, Aníbal, Jerry London and Ray Mendoza .

During the 60s, Ray Mendoza, Lagarde and Guajardo formed an alliance both inside and outside of the ring. In the ring, they competed alongside one another, outside of it, they were top negotiators. The pressure the three wrestlers placed on EMLL helped improve the conditions of other wrestlers working for that promotion. Guajardo and Lagarde's team, now known as "Los Rebeldes" (The Rebels), became National Tag Team champions in 1962. Guajardo, Lagarde and Mendoza would often team with one another, so when Lagarde and Mendoza were competing as a team, Guajardo would align himself with Rolando Vera and Benny Galán. On June 22, 1967, Guajardo achieved one of the greatest victories of his wrestling career when he defeated El Santo for the Mexican National Middleweight Championship, a title which Santo held for four years. Guajardo held the title for a few months until he lost it on March 9, 1968 to Alberto Muñoz. Guajardo regained the title on November 20, 1969, then lost it for the final time on May 13, 1970. In 1967, the Rebeldes team split up violently and both men started a long feud that culminated in their famous 1968 singles bout which saw Guajardo emerge victoriously.

When the famous EMLL split came in 1974, Guajardo, Mendoza and Lagarde played an instrumental role in the newly formed Universal Wrestling Association. On November 26, 1975, Guajardo became the first ever UWA World Middleweight Championship by defeating Anibal in Mexico City. He would later lose the title then regain it on October 31, 1976 from Gran Hamada, and finally lose it again on October 2, 1977 to Anibal.

Guajardo also began promoting "La Division del Norte" (The Northern Division) which was based in Monterrey and Nuevo León. His promotion company was very successful as it featured a less traditional style of wrestling that included a lot of ringside brawling and the use of bottles, chairs and illegal objects to "spice up" the matches. Guajardo competed sporadically until 1982 when he quietly retired from the ring. In 1990, he competed briefly as Indio Guajardo for Catch Wrestling Association (CWA) in Germany and the EWF in France. The primary reason for Guajardo working in Europe was to scout talent for the UWA promotion. He ended up bringing Chris Benoit, Owen Hart, and Too Cold Scorpio to the UWA after meeting them on this tour.

During his career, Guajardo won several wager matches against famous wrestlers, such as Halcon de Oro, Ray Mendoza, Black Shadow, Felipe Ham Lee, Chino Chow, Yamamoto and Perro Aguayo. He also appeared in four lucha libre action films. René Guajardo continued working as a wrestling promoter until his death on May 11, 1992, as a result of complications resulting from liver cancer. In 1996, he was inducted into the Wrestling Observer Newsletter Hall of Fame.

Championships and accomplishments
Empresa Mexicana de la Lucha Libre
Mexican National Middleweight Championship (2 times)
Mexican National Tag Team Championship (1 time) - with Karloff Lagarde
NWA World Middleweight Championship (6 times)
Universal Wrestling Association
UWA World Middleweight Championship (2 times)
Wrestling Observer Newsletter awards
Wrestling Observer Newsletter Hall of Fame (Class of 1996)

Luchas de Apuestas record

References

General sources - Championship Information

General sources - Career

Specific

1933 births
1992 deaths
Mexican male professional wrestlers
Mexican male film actors
20th-century Mexican male actors
Professional wrestlers from Tamaulipas
Mexican National Middleweight Champions
Mexican National Tag Team Champions
NWA World Middleweight Champions
UWA World Middleweight Champions